Donald Fred Rothwell (born October 8, 1952) is a former American football center who played in the National Football League for one season. He played college football at Kansas State and was drafted by the Detroit Lions in the 13th round of the 1974 NFL Draft.

Professional career
Rothwell was drafted by the Detroit Lions in the 1974 NFL Draft. Rothwell played 14 games for the Lions in the 1974 season. He was released by Detroit before the start of the next season.

Rothwell was also selected by the World Football League's Jacksonville Sharks in the 1974 WFL Draft, but he never signed with the team.

Post-playing career
Since his retirement, Rothwell has worked as a financial representative for Northwestern Mutual in Topeka, Kansas.

References

External links
 Pro Football Archives bio

1952 births
Living people
Sportspeople from Indiana
Players of American football from Indiana
Sportspeople from Florida
Players of American football from Gainesville, Florida
American football centers
Kansas State Wildcats football players
Detroit Lions players
People from Lafayette, Indiana